Cough CPR is the subject of a hoax email that began circulating in 1999. It is described as a "resuscitation technique" in which through prolonged coughing and deep breathing every 2 seconds, a person suffering a cardiac dysrhythmia immediately before cardiac arrest can keep conscious until help arrives (or until the person can get to the nearest hospital). Neither the American Heart Association nor the American Red Cross endorses cough CPR during a heart attack.

This confusion appears to revolve primarily over the public's failure to discriminate between a heart attack, cardiac arrest, and cardiac dysrhythmias. A heart attack occurs when an occlusion (e.g. blood clot) of an artery in the heart slowly causes tissue to die. This can result in chest pain and discomfort, and requires immediate medical attention to resolve the occlusion by emergency surgery or cardiac clot-busting drugs. A cardiac dysrhythmia is primarily an electrical problem within the heart, and is sometimes treated with electrolytes, vagal maneuver, or electrical cardioversion.  Many dysrhythmias may herald an impending heart attack.

Chain E-mails
Cough CPR has been the subject of a series of chain email campaigns. These emails are typically of the following format:  (See Snopes for this and other citation issues.)

Notes
  Statement by the AHA (updated Oct 6, 2011)

External links
  NIH article about Valsalva vagal maneuver

Internet hoaxes
1999 hoaxes
Cardiology
Cough

fr:Réanimation cardio-pulmonaire#La légende urbaine de la toux salvatrice